Tordylium elegans is a species of flowering plants in the family Apiaceae. It is endemic to Turkey.

References

External links

Apioideae
Plants described in 1971
Taxa named by Pierre Edmond Boissier
Taxa named by Benjamin Balansa